Parvaz Homay (born 9 February 1980) is an Iranian composer, lyricist, vocalist, and performer specializing in Persian classical-style music. Also known by his birth name Saeid Jafarzadeh Ahmadsargurabi, he is the founder and leader of the Mastan Ensemble.

Biography
Homay was born in Gilan, a province located in north-west portion of Iran, bordering the Caspian Sea. From an early age, Homay showed an interest in the arts. At the age of 15, he began singing and acting in theater. At 16, he entered art school where he would receive his diploma for painting.

At the age of 19, he left theater school and decided to study musical harmonization and composition with focus on piano and setar. He received his formal education in art studies and pursuing his degree from The Conservatory of Music in Tehran, Iran.

Albums by Homay and the Mastan Ensamble
Jedale Aghl va Eshgh (2005) (The Battle between Wisdom and Heart)
Molahgat ba Doozakhian (2006) (Meeting with the Infernals)
In Che Jahanist? (2007) (What Sort of World Is This?)
Sar Zamine Bi Karan (2008) (Endless Country)
Parvardgare Mast (2009) (Drunken Creator)
Ajab Abe Gelaloodi (2010) - unreleased (A Hidden Truth Within Muddy Waters)
Mussa va Shaban: Moses and the Shepherd (2010) - unreleased
Mastan Symphonic (2010) - unreleased
Morgh-e Sahar Naleh Sar Nakon (Don't Cry Morning Bird)
Sarbazaan (Soldiers)
Dar Aghoush-e Khoda (In the Bosom of God) 
Mast-e Mastam (I'm Dead Drunk)
Banu-ye Irani (Iranian Lady)
Kolahat ra Bekon Ghazi (Be Your Own Judge)
Bayadha Va Nabayadha (The Do's and Don't's)
Divaneh Cho Divaneh Bebinad Khoshash Ayad
Khodah Dar Roosta-ye Mast (God is in my Village)

References

1980 births
Living people
Iranian classical singers
Iranian composers
21st-century Iranian male singers
Iranian singer-songwriters
People from Gilan Province
Persian classical musicians
Islamic Azad University alumni